opened next to the Ōnaka Site in Harima, Hyōgo Prefecture, Japan in 2007. The museum exhibits archaeological finds from all over the prefecture.

See also

 List of Historic Sites of Japan (Hyōgo)

References

External links
  Hyōgo Prefectural Museum of Archaeology
  Hyōgo Prefectural Museum of Archaeology

Museums in Hyōgo Prefecture
Archaeological museums in Japan
Harima, Hyōgo
Museums established in 2007
2007 establishments in Japan
Prefectural museums